Midrasz was a Polish language monthly journal covering Jewish culture, literature and other topics published in Warsaw, Poland. It existed between April 1997 and December 2019.

History and profile
Midrasz was founded in 1997 by Konstanty Gebert, a renowned Polish journalist, war correspondent and Polish-Jewish activist. The first issue appeared in April 1997. The journal was devoted to Polish, Jewish and Polish-Jewish culture, art, literature, history and religion, as well as contemporary matters. Midrasz also published book reviews and longer essays on a regular basis.

Regular contributors included Zygmunt Bauman, Wilhelm Dichter, Henryk Grynberg, Eva Hoffman, Hanna Krall, Maria Janion, Krystyna Kersten, Jerzy Tomaszewski and Jan Woleński.

Approximately 80% of the readers of Midrasz were educated people between the age of 20 and 40; roughly 40% of the readers were Catholics, 25% were atheists and 15% were Jews.

The journal was closed down due to financial problems. The last issue of Midrasz was published in December 2019.

References

Citations

Bibliography

External links
 Official website

1997 establishments in Poland
2019 disestablishments in Poland
Defunct literary magazines published in Poland
Jewish magazines
Magazines established in 1997
Magazines disestablished in 2019
Magazines published in Warsaw
Monthly magazines published in Poland
Polish-language magazines
Jews and Judaism in Warsaw